E-Z Listening Disc is a compilation album by the American new wave band Devo, originally released in 1987 by Rykodisc. The album is a compilation of all but one of the tracks from Devo's two E-Z Listening Muzak Cassettes, which had been available only through Club Devo in 1981 and 1984, respectively, consisting of instrumental versions of Devo songs performed in the style of easy listening Muzak or New-age music.

Release History 
The first 'EZ Listening' Devo release was the 1981 'EZ Listening Muzak Cassette,' which was available to purchase through mail order slips included with Devo's fourth studio album, New Traditionalists. It featured 10 tracks. In 1984 they followed this up with 'EZ Listening Muzak Cassette Volume 2,' which included 10 more new tracks. 

In 1987 Rkyodisc released the more widely available 'E-Z Listening Disc,'  which included every track from the two cassette album minus the standard version of Shout. The "Hello Kitty" version, featuring synthesizers and an electric guitar, was included on the CD, whereas the other is a lounge music version featuring electronic piano, synth bass and drums. Additionally, the CD does not replicate the original cassette running order.

The album was re-released in March 2016, and was available as either a double album or two CD box set. Along with the twenty tracks originally found on the E-Z Listening Cassettes, the re-release also contains a newly recorded easy listening version of the song "Human Rocket" from Devo's 2010 album Something For Everybody.

Track listing
All songs by Mark Mothersbaugh and Gerald V. Casale, except where otherwise indicated.

EZ Listening Cassette

EZ Listening Cassette Volume 2

1987 Rykodisc CD

2016 Futurismo double CD/LP

Personnel
Devo
Mark Mothersbaugh
Bob Mothersbaugh
Gerald V. Casale
Bob Casale
Alan Myers

Technical
Hank Waring (FDS Labs) – digital processing
Dr. Toby Mountain – digital consultant
EXIT – graphic concepts and execution
Devo – arrangements
Gerald V. Casale – liner notes (2016 reissue)

References 

1987 compilation albums
Devo albums